This list of mines in Japan is subsidiary to the list of mines article and lists working, defunct and future mines in the country and is organised by the primary mineral output.

 
Japan
Gold mines